Wadugamudalige Joseph Maurice Ranga Dias (born August 14, 1979, Kandy) is a Sri Lankan cricketer. He plays first class cricket for the Tamil Union Cricket and Athletic Club and also represents Sri Lanka A. Debuting in 1999/00, Dias is a right-arm fast-medium bowler. He made his Twenty20 debut on 17 August 2004, for Tamil Union Cricket and Athletic Club in the 2004 SLC Twenty20 Tournament.

References

External links
 

1979 births
Living people
Sri Lankan cricketers
Tamil Union Cricket and Athletic Club cricketers
Cricketers from Kandy